Omukwiyugwemanya is a fig tree located in Oniipa constituency in Oshikoto region in the northern part of Namibia. Its name means "fig tree growing from a rock".  It is located on the Oshigambo River at Oshigambo High School. It is a tourist attraction for people from different countries.

See also
 List of individual trees

References

Tourist attractions in Namibia
Oshikoto Region
Individual trees in Namibia
Individual fig trees